237–245 New King's Road is a Grade II listed terrace of five houses at 237–245 New King's Road, Fulham, London, England.

The houses were built in about 1795.

References

External links
 

Grade II listed buildings in the London Borough of Hammersmith and Fulham
Grade II listed houses in London
Houses in the London Borough of Hammersmith and Fulham
Houses completed in the 18th century